King Huiwen of Qin (356–311 BC), also known as Lord Huiwen of Qin or King Hui of Qin, given name Si (駟), was the ruler of the Qin state from 338 to 311 BC during the Warring States period of Chinese history and likely an ancestor of Emperor Qin Shi Huang. He was the first ruler of Qin to style himself "King" (王) instead of "Duke" (公).

Biography

Early life
Prince Si was the son of Duke Xiao, and succeeded his father as ruler after the latter's death. When the adolescent Si was still crown prince, he committed a crime and was severely punished for it. The great minister Shang Yang was just then implementing his legalist reforms to the laws of Qin and he insisted that the crown prince should be punished for the crime regardless of his royal status. Duke Xiao approved of the draconian punishment and Si's tutors, Prince Qian (公子虔), Duke Xiao's older brother, and Gongsun Gu (公孫賈), for neglecting their duties in educating the crown prince, with Prince Qian having his nose cut off and Gongsun receiving the punishment of qing (黥; a form of punishment which involved branding a criminal by tattooing his face), while Ying Si was banished from the royal palace.

It was believed that Si harboured a personal grudge against Shang Yang and when he came to the throne as King Huiwen, Si had Shang Yang put to death on charges of treason. However, Huiwen retained the reformed systems in Qin left behind by his father and Shang Yang.

Reign 
During Huiwen's reign, Qin became very powerful in terms of its military strength, and constantly invaded neighbouring states as part of its expansionism policy. In 316 BC it conquered the states of Shu and Ba to the south in the Sichuan basin. The strategy here was to annex and colonize the semi-civilized lands to the south rather than confront the more advanced states to the east with their large armies. The strategist Gongsun Yan, a student of Guiguzi, managed to persuade five of the other six major states to form a alliance to deal with Qin. However, Gongsun Yan's fellow student, Zhang Yi, came into the service of Huiwen as his prime minister and he helped Qin break up the alliance by sowing discord among the five states.

Death 
King Huiwen ruled Qin for 27 years and died in 311 BC at the age of 46. He was succeeded by his son, King Wu of Qin, born of Queen Huiwen.

Family
Queens:
 Queen Huiwen, of Wei (d. 305 BC), possibly a daughter of King Hui of Wei; married in 334 BC; the mother of Crown Prince Dang
 Queen Dowager Xuan, of the Mi clan of Chu (d. 265 BC), a royal of Chu by birth; the mother of Princes Ji, Shi and Kui

Sons:
 Prince Tong (d. 311 BC), ruled as the Marquis of Shu from 313–311 BC
 Crown Prince Dang (329–307 BC), ruled as King Wu of Qin from 310–307 BC
 Prince Zhuang (d. 305 BC)
 Prince Yong (d. 305 BC)
 Prince Ji (325–251 BC), ruled as King Zhaoxiang of Qin from 306–251 BC
 Prince Yun (d. 301 BC), ruled as the Marquis of Shu from 308–301 BC
 Prince Shi
 Known by his title, Lord Gaoling
 Prince Kui
 Known by his title, Lord Jingyang
 Prince Yao
 Prince Chi

Daughters:
 Queen Yi of Yan
 Married King Yi of Yan (d. 321 BC) in 334 BC

Ancestry

In fiction and popular culture

 Portrayed by Fu Dalong in The Qin Empire II: Alliance (2012)
 Portrayed by Alex Fong in The Legend of Mi Yue (2015)
 Portrayed by Gallen Lo in Song of Phoenix (2017)

References

356 BC births
311 BC deaths
4th-century BC Chinese monarchs
Rulers of Qin